Lionel Rumi (born August 12, 1986) is a French-Israeli ice dancer and model. He skated for France with Élodie Brouiller and Scarlett Rouzet until 2008 and then began representing Israel with Brooke Frieling.

Personal life
Rumi was born in Lyon, in Rhône-Alpes, France. He immigrated to Israel in 2008.

Career
Rumi initially skated for France. His partners from 1999 to 2007 were Lætitia Fenet, Élodie Brouiller, and Scarlett Rouzet. He competed in ISU Junior Grand Prix events from 2003 through 2007 and the European Youth Olympic Games in 2003. He twice won the French national novice title and the junior title at the Master's de Patinage. He and Scarlett Rouzet were substitutes for the 2008 European Championships.

In 2008, Rumi teamed up with Brooke Frieling to compete for Israel. They placed 20th at the 2011 European Championships and 24th at the 2011 World Championships.

Competitive highlights

 Élodie Brouiller (2002–2005)
 Scarlett Rouzet (2005–2008)
 Brooke Frieling (2009-2011)

Personal bests

Music

References

External links
  ISU Biography
  Official Website of Israel Federation
  Official Website of Scarlett Rouzet and Lionel Rumi
  Official Website of Brooke Frieling and Lionel Rumi
  Lionel Rumi Facebook

1986 births
Living people
Sportspeople from Lyon
French male ice dancers
Israeli male ice dancers
Israeli people of French-Jewish descent
French Jews
French emigrants to Israel